Theron is a surname of Occitan origin (from place-names Théron, Thérond  variant form of *Thoron — same as  Le Thor (Vaucluse, Torum 1029) — from PIE *tur- or Latin torus "height"), and a given name in English. It may refer to:

Given name 
Theron of Acragas (died 473 BC), 5th century BC tyrant of Acragas, Sicily
Theron Akin (1855–1933), U.S. Representative from New York
Theron Ephron Catlin (1878–1960), U.S. Representative from Missouri
Theron Feemster, American record producer, songwriter, musician, and singer

Theron Hale (1883–1954), American old-time fiddle and banjo player
Theron Metcalf (1784–1875), New England jurist and judge
Theron Randolph, MD (1906–1995), founder of the holistic field of environmental illness and medicine known as clinical ecology
Theron Read (died 2009), American film actor
Theron Moses Rice (1829–1895), U.S. Representative from Missouri
Theron Sapp (born 1935), former American football running back
Theron Smith (born 1963), American cartoonist and designer.
Theron Smith (born 1980), American professional basketball player
Theron Strinden (1919–2011), American politician and businessman

Surname 
Charlize Theron (born 1975), South African actress
Daniel Theron (1870–1900), Boer officer
Dawie Theron (born 1966), former South African rugby union player
Duimpie Theron (born 1979), former Namibian rugby union player
Gus Theron (born 1975), former South African rugby union player
Inge Theron (born 1976), London-based South African skincare specialist and former radio personality
Johan Theron (born c. 1943), former South African government information officer
Johan Theron (born 1975), former Namibian tennis player
Juan "Rusty" Theron (born 1985), South African cricketer
Leo Theron (1926–2010), South African stained-glass window artist
Leona Theron (born 1966), South African Constitutional Court judge
Liniques Theron (born 1995), former Namibian female tennis player
Nelius Theron (born 1997), Namibian rugby union player
Servaas Theron (1918–1986), South African World War II fighter pilot

Other uses 
Theron Mountains, Coats Land, Antarctica
Therons, a race of fictional aliens in the Dan Dare stories
The Damnation of Theron Ware, 1896 novel by Harold Frederic 

Afrikaans-language surnames
Occitan-language surnames